A downhill bike (also known as a downhill mountain bike) is a full suspension bicycle designed for downhill cycling on particularly steep, technical trails.  Unlike a typical mountain bike, durability and stability are the most important design features, compared to lighter, more versatile cross-country bikes.  Downhill bikes are primarily intended for high-speed descent, and downhill riders will usually push, or shuttle via chairlifts or motorized vehicles, to the trailhead. Downhill bikes share similarities with freeride bikes due to their large strong frames and increased travel.

History

Geometry
These bikes will also have very slack head tube angles (63 degrees or less), long wheelbases (over ), and will accommodate the use of up to  width knobbed tires. Downhill frames are also overbuilt to handle the stress of riding over rocky terrain, drops, and jumps. Dual crown e-bikes typically weigh 25-35kg.

Adjustable head tube angles are also available to adapt the bike to the owner's preferred style of riding.

Components

Suspension 
Will typically have  of rear suspension travel, and be designed around a  suspension fork.  The suspension sag is also much higher than cross-country bikes (25%-50% of total travel vs. 10%-20%) for a more supple ride at higher speeds.

Fork 
Most downhill bikes use dual crown forks which allow longer travel at the front(usually  and increased stiffness that a single crown fork cannot offer. Drawbacks though, are increased weight and reduced turning radius.

Brakes 
Downhill bikes usually have hydraulic, quad piston disc brakes, and the discs may be 200 mm or larger. Brake discs and calipers may come with finned heatsinks for better heat dissipation.

Drivetrain 
Downhill bikes usually have a chain guide to prevent accidental chain derailment. Some manufacturers are experimenting with internal gearboxes for improved reliability. Cassettes will usually only contain a few small sprockets instead of the 12 sprockets found on other types of mountain bikes.

Tires 
Downhill bikes need very strong tires and wheels. The standard wheel size for downhill bikes is 27.5, but with recent changes to UCI World Cup Downhill rules, some brands are experimenting with 29" and "mullet" 29" cross 27.5" downhill bikes. Tires are usually 2.5-2.6" wide, plus tires are 2.8-3.0". Plus tires are only used in recreational riding, not competition.

Materials 
Downhill bikes are typically made of steel, aluminum or carbon fiber. Some manufacturers have started using 3d printed "lugs" for a more personalized geometry.

See also 
 Mountain bike
 Mountain biking
 Downhill mountain biking
 Bicycle suspension
 Single track (mountain biking)
 Glossary of cycling
 Outline of cycling

References

External links
 "A Brief History of the Mountain Bike" by Jobst Brandt

Cycle types
Mountain biking
Cycle sport